Below is a complete list of the German records in swimming, which are ratified by the German Swimming Federation (DSV).

Long course (50 m)

Men

Women

Mixed relay

Short Course (25 m)

Men

Women

Mixed relay

References
General
German records 18 December 2022 updated
Specific

External links

Germany
Records
Swimming
Swimming